Magazine Management Co., Inc. was an American publishing company lasting from at least 1947 to the early 1970s, known for men's-adventure magazines, risque men's magazines, humor, romance, puzzle, celebrity/film and other types of magazines, and later adding comic books and black-and-white comics magazines to the mix. It was the parent company of Atlas Comics, and its rebranded incarnation, Marvel Comics.

Founded by Martin Goodman, who had begun his career in the 1930s with pulp magazines published under a variety of shell companies, Magazine Management served as an early employer of such staff writers as Rona Barrett, Bruce Jay Friedman, David Markson, Mario Puzo, Martin Cruz Smith, Mickey Spillane, and Ernest Tidyman.

Subsidiaries of Magazine Management included Humorama, which published digest-sized magazines of girlie cartoons; and Marvel Comics. The company also published black-and-white comics magazines such as Vampire Tales, Savage Tales, and Unknown Worlds of Science Fiction that utilized primarily Marvel writers and artists.

History 
Founded by Martin Goodman, who had begun his career in the 1930s with pulp magazines published under a variety of shell companies,  Magazine Management existed as of at least 1947. By the early 1960s, the company occupied the second floor at 60th Street and Madison Avenue. It published men's-adventure magazines with such writers as Bruce Jay Friedman, David Markson, Mario Puzo, Martin Cruz Smith, Mickey Spillane, and Ernest Tidyman; film magazines with writers including Rona Barrett; and humor publications, among other types. By the late 1960s, its men's-adventure magazines such as Stag and Male had begun evolving into men's magazines, with pictorials about dancers and swimsuit models replaced by bikinis and discreet nude shots, with gradually fewer fiction stories, and eventually into pornographic magazines.

One division of the company was the Marvel Comics Group. As one-time Marvel editor-in-chief Roy Thomas recalled, "I was startled to learn in '65 that Marvel was just part of a parent company called Magazine Management."

In late 1968, Goodman sold all his publishing businesses to the Perfect Film and Chemical Corporation, which made the subsidiary Magazine Management Company the parent company of all the acquired Goodman concerns. Goodman remained as publisher until 1972. Perfect Film and Chemical renamed itself Cadence Industries and renamed Magazine Management as Marvel Comics Group in 1973, the first of many changes, mergers, and acquisitions that led to what became the 21st century corporation Marvel Entertainment.

Culture
As writer Dorothy Gallagher reminisced in 1998,

Author Adam Parfrey, in his book about men's adventure magazines, described how,

Titles published

Comics magazines

Humor magazines 
Best Cartoons from the Editors of Male & Stag, Magazine Management—published at least from 1973 to 1975)
 Cartoon Capers—published at least from vol. 4, #2 (1969) to vol. 10, #3 (1975)
 Cartoon Laughs—confirmed extant: vol 12, #3 (1973)
 Humorama titles

Men's-adventure and erotic magazines 
Magazine Management's publications included such men's adventure magazines as For Men Only, Male and Stag, edited during the 1950s by Noah Sarlat. As well, there were such ephemera as a one-shot black-and-white "nudie cutie" comic, The Adventures of Pussycat (Oct. 1968), that reprinted some stories of the sexy, tongue-in-cheek secret-agent strip that ran in some of his men's magazines. Marvel Comics writers Stan Lee, Larry Lieber and Ernie Hart, and artists Wally Wood, Al Hartley, Jim Mooney, and Bill Everett and "good girl art" cartoonist Bill Ward contributed.

Launched pre-1970 

 Action Life — ran 16 issues, Atlas Magazines
 Complete Man — published June 1965? to April 1967?, Atlas Magazines/Diamond
 For Men Only — confirmed at least from vol. 4, #11 (Dec. 1957) through at least vol. 26, #3 (March 1976)
Published by Canam Publishers at least 1957), Newsstand Publications Inc. (at least 1966–1967), Perfect Film Inc. (at least 1968), Magazine Management Co. Inc. (at least 1970) 
 Male — published at least vol. 1, #2 (July 1950) through 1977
 Male Home Companion
 Stag — at least 314 issues published February 1942 – Feb. 1976
Published by Official Communications Inc. (1951), Official Magazines (Feb. 1952 – March 1958), Atlas (July 1958 – Oct. 1968), Magazine Management (Dec. 1970 to end) 
 Stag Annual — at least 18 issues published 1964–1975
Published by Atlas (1964–1968), Magazine Management (1970–1975)
 Swank

Men published by Magazine Management.

1970s and later 
 FILM International — covering R- through X-rated movies

Other magazines 
Celebrity—extant in at least 1977
Modern Movies 
Movie World 
Screen Stars

References

1947 establishments in New York City
1973 disestablishments in New York (state)
American companies established in 1947
American companies disestablished in 1973
Marvel Comics
Publishing companies established in 1947
Publishing companies disestablished in 1973
Publishing companies of the United States
Publishing companies based in New York City